"Wait" is a song by French electronic music band M83. The track was released on 5 December 2012 as the fifth single from their sixth studio album, Hurry Up, We're Dreaming (2011).

Music video
A music video was released on 5 December 2012 that was directed by Fleur & Manu and produced by Jules de Chateleux and Jean Davi. A trilogy was successfully made after they finally made this video together with the other two music videos "Midnight City" and "Reunion".

Music video description

The video for "Wait" is the finale in the trilogy which began with "Midnight City" and continued in "Reunion", concerning a group of children with psychic powers who escaped their shadowy captors in the previous videos.

This video follows the 'antagonist' girl from the second video, now escaped and of her own free will but trapped on an Earth where some kind of cataclysm has taken place and the last few humans left attack and hate each other.  She meets a pack of white wolves who seem inquisitive towards her, and leaves with them as a man is chased and attacked by a group of other men and some kind of explosion occurs.  

Meanwhile, the main boy from the previous videos and the older blonde boy are somewhere in space travelling asleep in a Tetrahedron shape, and they seem to detect the explosion and come to, sensing the Earth's suffering.  The girl visits a desert and uses her power to find a droplet of water from within the sand, while the boys' craft travels towards Earth, putting them under considerable strain.  

On Earth, the girl lives with the pack of wolves in a rainforest (which may have been her own creation from the desert), and she looks to the sky, seemingly sensing the boys' approach.  As the tetrahedron approaches the planet, it breaks apart before entering the atmosphere and the boys fall to the surface.  The blonde boy is not seen again but the main boy falls through the sky and lands in the rainforest, not far from the girl.

In other media 
"Wait" was featured for Turner Classic Movies year end tribute for 2012 "TCM Remembers" which memorialized all of the entertainment personnel that died during the year.

In 2011, the song was featured in episode 9 of The Secret Circle. The song also featured in Gossip Girl, season 5 episode 14 The Backup Dan in 2012. 

The song was prominently featured in the 2014 film The Fault in Our Stars by Josh Boone, which he requested to be included as one of the songs for the film. Also in 2014, the song was featured at the end of the film Perfect Sisters and in The Vampire Diaries season six, episode five. 

The song was also featured in the 2012 film Step Up Revolution, and in the 2019 film Five Feet Apart. The song was featured also in the science-fiction drama tv series Under The Dome in episode 7 of the first season. 

The song was used in the 2018 ballet, Hurry Up, We're Dreaming. Also, season 1 episode 1 of Netflix Series Ragnarok features this song in the very beginning during the opening.

Norwegian music producer Kygo made a free remix of the song which he released in 2014.

The song was used in the PBS American Experience "Chasing the Moon", a 2019 documentary film by Robert Stone, features the human race to the moon for a new generation with conventional mythology.

Charts

Certifications

References

External links
 

2011 songs
2012 singles
M83 (band) songs
Mute Records singles
Songs written by Morgan Kibby
English-language French songs
Songs written by Justin Meldal-Johnsen